The 106th Brigade (or Awlia Aldem) is a military unit of the Libyan National Army, loyal to Field marshal Khalifa Haftar. It was established as a brigade in 2018.

History 
The 106th Battalion was created in 2016, from militias serving as Haftar's personal guard in 2014. It became the 106th Brigade in 2018, through incorporation of various other units.

The 106th Battalion first saw combat in the 2018 Battle of Derna.

The brigade participated in the capture of Sabha in January 2019. It fought in the failed Tripoli offensive, beginning hostilities on the night of April 4 by seizing a chekpoint between Tripoli and Zawiya. The brigade then performed poorly in the offensive around Zawiya. Many of the brigade's soldiers were captured by the Government of National Accord forces.

On 17 July 2019, according to witnesses cited by The Independent and a family member cited by CNN, 25–30 masked, uniformed 106th Brigade members abducted member of the Libyan House of Representatives Seham Sergiwa in Benghazi.

In May 2022, the 106th Brigade was deployed to the Chad–Libya border.

Commander 
The 106th Battalion was commanded by Haftar's son, Saddam. He was replaced by his brother Khalid. Major General Salem Rahil took command in mid-2019 but Khalid Haftar remains the de facto leader of the unit.

Equipment and fighters 
Due to its link with Haftar's family, the Brigade has received many modern equipements, such as Emirati Nimr and Jordanian Al-Wahsh APCs, and Kornet ATGM. It also received TAG Terrier LT-79 APCs in December 2019.

The Brigade is more professional than previous units of the LNA. The brigade received officers from the new NLA military academy. However, the induction of poorly trained recruits in 2019 reduced the military potential of the brigade.

Composition 

 101st Battalion

 123rd Battalion
 126th Battalion
 155th Battalion
 166th Battalion
 192nd Battalion
 208th Battalion
 214th Tank Battalion
 270th Battalion
 322nd Artillery Battalion

References 

Military of Libya
Second Libyan Civil War
Rebel groups in Libya